Lovecraft Country is an American horror drama television series developed by Misha Green based on and serving as a continuation of the 2016 novel of the same name by Matt Ruff. Starring Jurnee Smollett and Jonathan Majors, it premiered on August 16, 2020, on HBO. The series is produced by Monkeypaw Productions, Bad Robot Productions, and Warner Bros. Television Studios.  The series is about a young Black man who travels across the segregated United States in the 1950s in search of his missing father, learning of dark secrets plaguing a town on which famous horror writer H. P. Lovecraft supposedly based the location of many of his fictional tales. While a second season, Lovecraft Country: Supremacy, was in development, HBO announced in July 2021 that the series had been canceled.

Premise
Lovecraft Country follows "Atticus Freeman as he joins up with his friend Letitia and his Uncle George to embark on a road trip across 1950s Jim Crow America in search of his missing father. This begins a struggle to survive and overcome both the racist terrors of white America and the terrifying monsters that could be ripped from a Lovecraft paperback".

The episodes "I Am." and "Jig-a-Bobo" establish that the Lovecraft Country novel exists in the continuity of the series as a novel written by George Freeman II fictionalizing the events of the series, which is retrieved from the future by his father Atticus Freeman in an attempt to change the story's narrative conclusion.

Cast and characters

Main

 Jurnee Smollett as Letitia "Leti" Lewis, an old friend and love interest of Atticus, who is a skilled photographer
 Jonathan Majors as Atticus "Tic" Freeman, a young man who served in the Korean War. Majors also portrays George Freeman II, Tic's future son, in photographs.
 Aunjanue Ellis as Hippolyta Freeman, Atticus's aunt and a star-gazer with an itch for adventure
 Courtney B. Vance as George Freeman, Atticus's warm, funny and well-read uncle. Vance also portrays another George from an alternate timeline in "I Am.".
 Wunmi Mosaku as Ruby Baptiste, Leti's estranged older half-sister. Mosaku also portrays Christina Braithwhite having taken Ruby's form.
 Abbey Lee as Christina Braithwhite, the sole daughter of the leader of the secret society known as the Order of the Ancient Dawn
 Jamie Chung as Ji-Ah, a seemingly naïve Korean nursing student whom Atticus had an affair with. She is also possessed by a kumiho.
 Jada Harris as Diana Freeman, George and Hippolyta's daughter as well as Atticus's younger cousin and Montrose's niece
 Michael K. Williams as Montrose Freeman, Atticus's hard-headed and secretive father

Recurring
 Jordan Patrick Smith as William, Christina's former henchman and lover, whose form she assumes
 Joaquina Kalukango as Hanna, Atticus's slave ancestor, a former cleaning woman in Titus Braithwhite's mansion
 Jamie Neumann as Dell / Hillary, whose form Ruby assumes
 Erica Tazel as Dora Freeman, Atticus's mother, Montrose's wife and George's lover / sister-in-law
 Mac Brandt as Seamus Lancaster, an Order of the Ancient Dawn leader and Chicago police captain
 Deron J. Powell as Tree, a man who attended high school with Leti and Atticus
 Lucius Baston as Phil Hodges, the locksmith
 Regina Taylor as Hattie
 Rhyan Hill as Emmett "Bobo" Till
 Sibongile Mlambo as Tamara
 Jonathan Pawlowski as Burke

Guest
 Jamie Harris as Eustice Hunt, the sheriff of Devon County
 Demetrius Grosse as Marvin Baptiste, Leti's half-brother
 Tony Goldwyn as Samuel Braithwhite, the arrogant leader of a secret society
 Shangela as Lena Horne
 Monét X Change as Dinah Washington
 Darryl Stephens as Billie Holiday
 James Kyson as Byung-Ho
 Monique Candelaria as Yahima, two-spirit
 Matthew Alan as Deputy Eastchurch

Episodes

Production

Development
On May 16, 2017, it was announced that HBO had given a series order to Lovecraft Country. Executive producers include Misha Green, Jordan Peele, J. J. Abrams, and Ben Stephenson. Additionally, Green serves as the series' showrunner and wrote the pilot episode. Production companies involved in the series include Monkeypaw Productions, Bad Robot Productions, and Warner Bros. Television. It was reported that Peele originally brought the project to Bad Robot Productions and enlisted Green to develop the show.

On March 5, 2018, it was announced that Yann Demange would direct and executive produce the pilot episode. While a second season had yet to be officially greenlit for production, by February 2021, HBO's president of programming Casey Bloys announced that Misha Green had begun writing and was in early planning stages. On July 2, 2021, HBO announced that the series would not be returning for a second season. In James Andrew Miller's book Tinderbox: HBO's Ruthless Pursuit of New Frontiers, several writers of the show claimed it was allegedly cancelled due to Green's creation of a toxic work environment.

Casting
On April 26, 2018, it was announced that Jurnee Smollett had been cast as the series' female lead. On May 2, 2018, it was reported that Jonathan Majors had joined the main cast as the series' male lead. A day later, it was reported that Wunmi Mosaku had also been cast as a series regular. On June 19, 2018, it was announced that Aunjanue Ellis and Elizabeth Debicki had been cast as series regulars and that Courtney B. Vance had joined the series in a recurring capacity. On October 10, 2018, it was reported that Michael Kenneth Williams had been cast in a leading role. On June 14, 2019, it was reported that Abbey Lee had replaced Elizabeth Debicki in the role of Christina Braithwaite, while Jamie Chung and Jordan Patrick Smith had been cast in recurring roles. On June 20, 2019, it was announced that Jamie Neumann, Erica Tazel, and Mac Brandt had been cast in recurring capacities. In July 2019, Tony Goldwyn joined the cast.

Filming
Principal photography for the series began on July 16, 2018 in Chicago, Illinois. Filming also reportedly took place at the Chicago Cinespace Film Studios in Elburn, Illinois and White Pines State Park in Mount Morris, Illinois, at Blackhall Studios in Atlanta, Georgia and Macon, Georgia.

Music
Laura Karpman composed the music for the show. Due to the COVID-19 pandemic, Karpman and her composing team had to score the show individually from their residences in eastern Europe, with Karpman adding some music tracks of her playing piano, keyboards, and other instruments. Karpman reflected on how difficult it was composing the show with the pandemic's restrictions, due to not being able to have immediate interaction with the musicians. She felt satisfied with the finished result.

Release
Lovecraft Country premiered on August 16, 2020, on HBO and HBO Max, and consists of ten episodes.

Home media
The complete series was released on February 16, 2021, on Blu-ray and DVD.

Reception

Critical response

Lovecraft Country has received positive reviews. On review aggregator website Rotten Tomatoes, the series holds an approval rating of 88% based on 367 reviews, with an average rating of 8.05/10. The site's critics consensus reads: "Anchored by Jurnee Smollett-Bell and Jonathan Majors' heroic performances, Misha Green's Lovecraft Country is a thrilling take on Lovecraftian lore that proves the Elder Gods aren't the only thing that goes bump in the cosmos." On Metacritic, the series has a weighted average score of 79 out of 100, based on 42 critics, indicating "generally favorable reviews".

Writing for The A.V. Club, Shannon Miller lauded the show's ability to balance Lovecraft's more problematic political views with "an appreciation for [his] unparalleled vision". Brian Tallerico of RogerEbert.com pointed to the show's use of genre storytelling "to peel back layers of American history to reveal the systemic problems underneath it", while also describing it as "marvelously entertaining". Hugo Rifkind of The Times described the show as "brutal and righteously furious". The Chicago Tribunes Michael Phillips, in reference to earlier, less successful attempts at adaptation of Lovecraft's works, said the show "succeeds where others have not" and commended the show on its themes, despite calling the five episodes available for early review "uneven". The New York Timess Mike Hale credited Green's "impressively seamless job... in wielding the cultural metaphors" as part of the show's strength. In a review for The Dispatch, Alec Dent praised the show's success at "examin[ing] racism in America's past through an unexpected genre", calling it a good reminder that "oftentimes true evil takes a normal guise". In a more critical review, Daniel D'Addario of Variety wrote that "the violence of Lovecraftian horror is so extreme [...] that even the most evil impulses of humanity seem an inadequate counterweight".

In an analysis of the series, Maya Phillips of The New York Times criticized it for "exploiting [the past] for the purposes of its convoluted fiction", despite a promising premise. She accused the show's creators of using historical events purely "to get points for relevance", notable examples of this being the funeral of Emmett Till and the Tulsa race massacre, both of which are featured in the show.

Awards and nominations

Notes

References

External links
 
 

2020 American television series debuts
2020 American television series endings
2020s American black television series
2020s American drama television series
2020s American horror television series
2020s American LGBT-related drama television series
2020s American supernatural television series
Adaptations of works by H. P. Lovecraft
American horror fiction television series
English-language television shows
HBO original programming
Horror drama television series
Racism in television
Fiction about secret societies
Television series about monsters
Television series about parallel universes
Television series by Bad Robot Productions
Television series by Warner Bros. Television Studios
Television series set in 1955
Television series set in the 1920s
Television series set in the 1950s
Television shows based on American novels
Television shows filmed in Atlanta
Television shows filmed in Illinois
Television shows set in Chicago
Television shows set in Massachusetts
Works about the Tulsa race massacre